A constitutional referendum was held in Niue on 13 June 1992. The proposed amendments to the constitution were the first since the country's original constitution was approved in a 1974 referendum. The changes were approved by 70.4% of voters, and came into force on 1 July.

Proposed changes
The changes to the constitution included the introduction of the Niuean High Court and Court of Appeal, replacing the use of the equivalent courts in New Zealand. The reforms also abolished the Niue Land Court and the Niue Land Appeal Court, instead creating a Land Division in the new High Court.

Qualifications for political candidates were amended to require New Zealand citizenship. It also removed article 31, a requirement for the Chief Justice to approve any legislative proposal that would affect criminal law or personal status. This effectively removed the human rights element of the constitution.

Results

Aftermath
Following the approval of the changes, there was subsequent criticism that the individual changes should have been voted on separately, as well as of the removal of article 31.

References

Niue
1992 in Niue
Referendums in Niue
Constitutional referendums
June 1992 events in Oceania